WXRC (95.7 FM, "95.7 The Ride") is a commercial FM radio station licensed to serve Hickory, North Carolina, and targeting the Charlotte market. The station is owned by David Lingafelt and his Pacific Broadcasting Group and broadcasts a classic hits format. Its studios are located in Newton and its broadcast tower is located east of Lincolnton, North Carolina.

WXRC airs Acoustic Storm, an acoustic based set, Sundays from 8-11AM and 9PM-midnight. The station is the Charlotte affiliate for North Carolina State Wolfpack football and basketball.

History

On May 8, 1962, the Federal Communications Commission granted Foothills Broadcasting, Inc. a construction permit for a new FM station on 95.7 MHz with an effective radiated power (ERP) of 11,300 watts. The station was granted its first license on January 24, 1963, with the WIRC-FM call sign.

The station's call sign was changed to WXRC effective September 26, 1966. On January 13, 1967, Foothills Broadcasting applied for a construction permit to increase the station's ERP to 27,000 watts. The FCC granted the permit on March 13, 1967, followed by a new license with the upgraded facilities on April 2, 1968.

On April 19, 1979, Foothills Broadcasting applied for a construction permit to increase the station's ERP to 100,000 watts. The FCC granted the permit on February 5, 1980, followed by a new license with the upgraded facilities on January 27, 1981.

From the early 1980s to 1985, WXRC was "X-Rock", an adult contemporary format using the automated TM Stereo Rock programming service.

Three months later, on June 21, 1984, the FCC granted a voluntary reassignment of the station's license from Foothills Broadcasting, Inc. to Broadcast, Ltd with a consummation date of December 11, 1984. The FCC granted the construction permit on November 20, 1984 and granted a new license with the new facilities on August 21, 1985. On July 31, 1985, the FCC granted a voluntary reassignment of the station's license from Broadcast, Ltd to Westcom, Ltd. with a consummation date of September 20, 1985.

In 1985, the station changed to live album-oriented rock. Programmed in the first year by local native and Appalachian State Graduate Greg Mull (see K-Rock Fort Myers and 98 Rock Tampa) and fellow ASU graduates Justin 'Jay' Phelps and Jon Austin, the station during the '80s placed in the top 10 of Charlotte Arbitron ratings during Fall 1985-December 1986. After Mull's departure in 1986, both Phelps and Austin served in music director roles, under various hired program directors in the 1980s including Bob Raleigh who later went on to launch classic rock WCKN (now WROQ) in Greenville, SC. Raleigh also went on to become a corporate programmer for many years at Cumulus Media and Westwood One Network.

The FCC granted the permit on August 4, 1988. On December 14, 1989, the FCC granted a modification to the construction permit requested by Westcom, Ltd. to move the transmitter to "LINCOLN COUNTY, 0.5 KM SW OF INTERSECTION OF STATE ROUTES 73 & 1385". The FCC granted a new license with the upgraded facilities on May 4, 1990.

On October 5, 1994, the FCC granted a voluntary reassignment of the station's license from Westcom, Ltd. to Pacific Broadcasting Group, Inc. The sale consummated on November 22, 1994.

Over the years, WXRC has tried various rock formats, including Triple-A. At one point, the station emphasized hard rock and heavy metal, branding itself as "The Panther". The Carolina Panthers, Charlotte's NFL team, subsequently sued the station. The switch to the current format was made in 2002.

WXRC was the Charlotte affiliate for The Howard Stern Show from April 15, 1997, to 2001. It climbed as high as second in the Charlotte ratings until dropping Stern for Lex and Terry in 2001. Throughout many changes musically, its playlist today consists mostly of artists from the "classic rock" era including the 1960s, 1970s, 1980s, and 1990s.

One of the few independently owned-and-operated stations in the Charlotte market, its sound is very similar to how most FM stations sounded in the 1970s. Lingafelt has received a number of offers to sell his station over the years. However, he told The Charlotte Observer that he was not willing to sell to anyone, claiming that his station's format would never be possible under a corporate owner. In 2008, the station was rated the 12th most popular station in Charlotte by Arbitron, but was rated second in the critical 25-49 demographic.

Signal note
WXRC is short-spaced to WHPE-FM (licensed to serve High Point, North Carolina) as they operate on first adjacent channels (95.5 and 95.7) and the distance between the stations' transmitters is 67 miles as determined by FCC rules. The minimum distance between a Class C0 FM radio station (WXRC) and a Class C1 FM radio station (WHPE-FM) operating on first adjacent channels according to current FCC rules is 122 miles. WXRC uses a directional antenna to reduce its signal toward the northeast, in the direction of WHPE-FM.

References

External links

XRC
Radio stations established in 1962